Winfield is a small city in Titus County, Texas, United States. The population was 524 at the 2010 census.

History
Winfield's history includes (in addition to railroad operations) coal mining, brick and pottery manufacturing, and the famous Winfield Truck Stop.

When the Texas and St. Louis Railway was being constructed through western Titus County in 1880, the citizens of Gray Rock, on the western boundary of the county, were asked to donate money and land to the company for routing the road through their community. When the merchants refused to cooperate, W. C. Barrett deeded a portion of his land a mile northeast of Gray Rock to railroad officials for a depot, and the road was built north of Gray Rock. At its earliest stages the community that began to emerge around the depot was called Barrett, but when the post office was opened there in 1887 with Patrick H. Carr as postmaster, the village was called Carr. In 1892 the name was changed to Winfield, in honor of the general passenger agent for the railroad, W. H. Winfield. In 1890 the population was reported at forty-seven. By 1896 the town had three churches, several stores, a pottery operated by J. S. Hogue, and a population estimated at 150. During the early years of the twentieth century, the town experienced its greatest period of growth. By 1914 it had a brick company, a newspaper, numerous stores and gins, two banks, and a population estimated at 700. The two banks merged in 1919, and the resulting bank closed in the early 1920s. By 1925 the population of Winfield had declined to 629, and by the 1940s it was 350. The town was incorporated in the 1940s and maintained a relatively stable population for several decades. In 1980 residents numbered 349, and in 1982 the town had five rated businesses. In 1990 the population was 345.

Geography

Located on Interstate 30, approximately halfway between Mount Pleasant and Mount Vernon, Winfield is the second largest town in Titus County.

Winfield is located at  (33.166177, –95.111027).

According to the United States Census Bureau, the city has a total area of 0.9  square miles (2.4 km), of which, 0.9  square miles (2.4 km) of it is land and 1.06% is water.

Climate

The climate in this area is characterized by hot, humid summers and generally mild to cool winters.  According to the Köppen Climate Classification system, Winfield has a humid subtropical climate, abbreviated "Cfa" on climate maps.

Demographics

As of the 2020 United States census, there were 422 people, 140 households, and 129 families residing in the city.

Education

Winfield is now served by Mount Pleasant Independent School District for grades K–12. Mount Pleasant High School is the local high school.

Winfield Independent School District served Winfield until 2018. Winfield ISD had one school, Winfield Elementary, that served students in grades kindergarten through eight, while Mount Pleasant ISD and Mount Pleasant HS served the district at the high school level only.

References

Further reading

 Map of Titus County showing area school districts prior to WISD consolidation – Texas Education Agency - Web version
 

Cities in Titus County, Texas
Cities in Texas
1880 establishments in Texas